Pietro Bellino (died 14 January 1641) was a Roman Catholic prelate who served as Bishop of Saluzzo (1636–1641).

Biography
On 3 March 1636, Pietro Bellino was appointed during the papacy of Pope Urban VIII as Bishop of Saluzzo.

On 30 March 1636, he was consecrated bishop by Ciriaco Rocci, Cardinal-Priest of San Salvatore in Lauro, with Giovanni Battista Altieri, Bishop Emeritus of Camerino, and Ottavio Broglia, Bishop of Asti, serving as co-consecrators. 

He served as Bishop of Saluzzo until his death on 14 January 1641.
 
While bishop, he was the principal co-consecrator of Giusto Guérin, Bishop of Genève (1639).

References 

17th-century Italian Roman Catholic bishops
Bishops appointed by Pope Urban VIII
Year of birth missing
1641 deaths